James T. "Jim" Stephens (born April 14, 1939) is an American billionaire heir, businessman and philanthropist from Alabama.

Early life
James T. Stephens was born on April 14, 1939, in Birmingham, Alabama. His father, Elton Bryson Stephens, Sr., founded EBSCO Industries in 1944. His mother, Alys Robinson, died in 1996.

He graduated from Yale University, where he received a bachelor's degree in history in 1961. He received an MBA from the Harvard Business School in 1964.

Career
Stephens served as a lieutenant in the United States Army. He joined the family business, EBSCO Industries, where he served as President from 1970 to 2005. He served as its chairman from 2002 to 2017.

He was inducted into the Alabama Business Hall of Fame in 2008 and the Alabama Academy of Honor in 2012.

Philanthropy
Stephens previously served as the chairman of the boards of trustees of the Highlands School, the Altamont School, and Birmingham-Southern College. Additionally, he served as the chairman of the Greater Alabama Council of the Boy Scouts of America.

He donated US$2 million to the United Way of Central Alabama. He has endowed scholarships at Jefferson State Community College, Troy University, and Birmingham-Southern College. He has also made charitable contributions to the God's Outreach Center in Harpersville, Alabama as well as UNICEF and Doctors Without Borders.

With his father, Stephens donated US$2.5 million to the University of Alabama at Birmingham. They also donated US$15 million for the construction of the Elton B. Stephens Science Center on the campus of Birmingham–Southern College.

Personal life
He is married to Julie Stephens. They have four children, Bryson, Trent, Bart, and Alys.

References

Living people
1939 births
People from Mountain Brook, Alabama
Yale University alumni
Harvard Business School alumni
United States Army officers
Businesspeople from Birmingham, Alabama
Philanthropists from Alabama
Stephens family
American billionaires